Lebasee may refer to:-

Łebsko Lake (Lebasee in German)
, a cargo ship launched in 1996